The Dismissal is an Australian television miniseries, first screened in 1983, that dramatised the events of the 1975 Australian constitutional crisis.

It was partly written and directed by the noted film makers George Miller and Phillip Noyce as well as Mad Max screenwriter Terry Hayes, with cinematography by Dean Semler.

The miniseries comprised six one-hour episodes. It was originally broadcast by Network Ten, beginning on 6 March 1983 (the day after the 1983 federal election), and was also broadcast in the United Kingdom.
 
It was voted the 19th-best Australian television show on the 50 Years 50 Shows list.

In the 1970s there were several attempts to make a film based on the same story called King Hit written by Erwin Rado and Bruce Grant. Phillip Noyce and Paul Cox were both attached as directors for a time.

Cast
 Max Phipps as the dismissed Labor Prime Minister Gough Whitlam
 John Meillon as Governor-General Sir John Kerr
 John Stanton as the appointed Liberal Prime Minister Malcolm Fraser
 John Hargreaves as Whitlam's Deputy Prime Minister Jim Cairns
 Bill Hunter as Labor politician Rex Connor
 Ruth Cracknell as Margaret Whitlam, the prime minister's wife
 George Ogilvie as Labor Senator Jim McClelland
 Peter Sumner as Treasurer Bill Hayden
 Vincent Ball as Labor Senator Justin O'Byrne, President of the Senate
 Ed Devereaux as Phillip Lynch
 Arthur Dignam as Eric Robinson
 Stewart Faichney as Billy Snedden
 Robyn Nevin as Anne Kerr, Lady Kerr
 Tom Oliver as Liberal Senator Reg Withers
 Sean Scully as Doug Anthony
 Martin Vaughan as independent Senator Albert Field
 Lucky Grills (uncredited) as George Harris, President of Carlton Football Club
 Peter Carroll, narrator

See also 
 The Dismissal (musical)

References

External links

The Dismissal at Australian Screen Online

Network 10 original programming
1980s Australian television miniseries
1983 television films
1983 films
Period television series
Films set in the Australian Capital Territory
1975 Australian constitutional crisis
Cultural depictions of politicians
Cultural depictions of Australian men